Mitul Marma is a Bangladeshi footballer who plays as a goalkeeper for Bangladesh Premier League club Fortis FC and the Bangladesh national team.

Mitul has played for Bangladesh U15 and Bangladesh U19 too. He also won 2018 SAFF U-15 Championship with Bangladesh U-15.

Club career
Mitul's journey into football was guided by Shantjit Tanchangya, a local primary school teacher in Rangamati. He started with Bangabandhu Primary School football after which he represented the Rangamati District Team. In 2017, he played in the Dhaka Third Division League for office club Bangladesh Government Press (BG Press). The following year, Mitul represented Mohammedan SC at the BFF U-18 Tournament.

In 2019, Mitul joined Uttar Baridhara Club, however, he failed to make an appearance after the league season was cancelled due to the COVID-19 pandemic. On 5 February 2021, he made his debut for the club against Mohammedan SC, during the 2020–21 Bangladesh Premier League season. Throughout the campaign he transitioned into the clubs first choice goalkeeper and managed to make a total of 18 appearances in the league which earned him a senior national team call up later that year.

On 25 November 2021, Mitul joined Sheikh Jamal DC after his impressive stint with Uttar Baridhara Club.

On 7 August 2022, Mitul joined newcomers Fortis FC.

International career

Youth
Mitul played 2018 SAFF U-15 Championship for Bangladesh U-15. He played a vital role to make his team champion of the tournament. He started the final match of the tournament, however, was substituted by Mehedi Hasan during the penalty shootout. Mitul also played 2018 UEFA Assist U-15 Development Tournament in Thailand.

Mitul is a regular member of Bangladesh U-19 team too. He played 2019 SAFF U-18 Championship and 2020 AFC U-19 Championship qualification with Bangladesh side. He also represented Bangladesh in 2019 U19 Three Nations Tournament, an invitational tournament, hosted by Qatar Football Association.

Mitul was named on the Bangladesh U23 team by coach Maruful Haque for the AFC U-23 Championship 2022 Qualifiers. On 2 November 2021 he started the last group stage match against Saudi Arabia U23 which concluded in a 3-0 defeat, However during the game Mitul was replaced by goalkeeper Pappu Hossain in the first half

Senior
Mitul got his first call up in the Bangladesh national team in March 2021 as a under-23 standby player. In August 2021, Mitul has been called up in 23-men final squad ahead of Three Nations Cup in Kyrgyzstan. He made his debut for Bangladesh against Kyrgyzstan in an unofficial match on 9 September 2021.

Honours

International
Bangladesh U15
SAFF U-15 Championship: 2018

References

External links 
 Mitul Marma at soccerway.com

2003 births
Living people
Bangladeshi footballers
Bangladesh youth international footballers
Association football goalkeepers
Sheikh Jamal Dhanmondi Club players
Uttar Baridhara SC players
People from Rangamati District
Bangladesh Football Premier League players